Sparkle and Fade is the second album by Everclear, released in 1995. It was their first album to be released exclusively on Capitol Records; their previous effort, World of Noise, was re-released on Capitol after its introduction through the Portland, Oregon based label, Tim/Kerr Records. The album produced the singles "Heroin Girl," "Santa Monica," "Heartspark Dollarsign," and "You Make Me Feel Like a Whore." The album's music follows themes like addiction and romance through a loosely defined narrative similar to Art Alexakis' own troubled life when he was in his twenties.

The album's cover features childhood pictures of the three members of the band. It is Everclear's third-best-selling album to date. It climbed to the top of the Heatseekers Chart in January 1996 and was certified Platinum by the RIAA in May 1996.

Critical reception
Trouser Press wrote that "the sheer radiance of songs like 'Santa Monica' (which demands repeated listens) adds to the luster of this unexpected gem."

Track listing
All songs written by Art Alexakis, Craig Montoya, and Greg Eklund, except as noted.

Personnel
Art Alexakis – guitar, vocals
Greg Eklund – drums
Craig Montoya – bass guitar

Charts

Weekly charts

Year-end charts

Certifications

References

1995 albums
Capitol Records albums
Everclear (band) albums
Albums produced by Art Alexakis